Ronhausen is a borough (Ortsbezirk) of Marburg in Hesse.

References

External links 

 Information about Ronhausen at www.marburg.de 

Districts of Marburg
Marburg-Biedenkopf